Titancraft is the ninth studio album by German heavy/power metal band Iron Savior. It was released on 20 May 2016 by AFM Records and on 25 May 2016 by Japanese-based record label Avalon. It was recorded, mixed and mastered at Powerhouse Studio in Hamburg from September 2015 - February 2016 with the bass being recorded at John Zorn MR. It is the last album to feature long time drummer Thomas Nack when he departed the band in 2017.

A music video was made for "Way of the Blade".

Track listing

Credits
Piet Sielck – vocals, guitars, keyboards
Joachim "Piesel" Küstner – guitars
Jan-Sören Eckert – bass
Thomas Nack – drums

Additional musicians
Frank Beck – backing vocals
Pippa Sielck – backing vocals

Production
Felipe Machado Franco - Cover Art, Artwork, Design

Charts

References

Iron Savior albums
2016 albums
AFM Records albums